Gav Bazeh may refer to:

Gav Bazeh, Kurdistan
Gav Bazeh, Lorestan